White Ruthenia, White Rus, is an archaism for the eastern part of present-day Belarus, including the cities of Polotsk, Vitebsk and Mogilev. It is a common misconception that this region may also be called White Russia, however this is incorrect with the name predating the creation of Russia by a few centuries. Instead it derives from Ruthenia, a region which lies in modern day Ukraine and Belarus. The name Belarus refers to white Ruthenia and not Russia as is commonly believed.

History 

Many other variations of this name appeared on ancient maps; for instance, Russia Alba, Russija Alba, Wit Rusland, Weiß Reußen (Weißreußen), White Russia, Hviterussland, Hvíta Rússland, Weiß Russland (Weißrussland), Ruthenia Alba, Ruthénie Blanche and Weiß Ruthenien (Weißruthenien). The name was also assigned to various territories, often quite distant from that of present Belarus. For example, at one time the term was applied to Novgorod.

The 16th century chronicler Alexander Guagnini's book Sarmatiae Europeae descriptio wrote that Rus' was divided in three parts. The first part, under the rule of the Muscovite Grand Duke, was called White Russia. The second one, under the rule of Polish king, was called Black Ruthenia. And the rest was Red Ruthenia.

Only by the late 19th century, the name was associated with the area of present Belarus. The origins of the name, which is attested from the 14th century, are unclear. Vasmer's dictionary mentions the dichotomy of "white" land and "taxed" land in Domostroy and speculates that "white" Russia may have referred to the parts of Russia that were not subject to Tatar rule. Another speculation in Vasmer is that the color of the clothes of the White Ruthenians (perhaps as well as the color of their hair) may have contributed to the name. Oleg Trubachyov calls both theories "complete fantasies".

According to Alfred Nicolas Rambaud:The name of White Ruthenia is given to the provinces conquered from the 13th to the 14th century by the Grand Dukes of Lithuania. These were the ancient territories of the Krivitches, Polotchans, Dregovitches, Drevlians, Doulebes, now forming the governments of Vitepsk, Mohilef, and Minsk.

See also 
 Black Ruthenia
 Red Ruthenia

References

Sources 

 Akta Aleksandra, króla polskiego, wielkiego księcia litewskiego i t.d. (1501—1506). Wyd. F. Papee. Kraków, 1927
 Alexandrowicz S. Rozwój kartografii Wielkiego Księstwa Litewskiego od XV do połowy XVIII w. Poznań, 1989
 Anonymi Dvbnicensis. Liber de rebus Lvdovici R. H.. Analecta Monumentorum Hungariae historicum literarorium maximum inedita. Budapestini, 1986
 I.V. Bellum Prutenum. Smereka E. Zbiór pisarzy polsko–lacińskich. Leopoli, 3, 1933
 Colker M. L. America rediscovered in thirteenth century?. Speculum. A journal of medieval studies. Cambridge. Vol. 54. No. 4. October 1979
 Cosmographey oder beschreibung aller Laender, Herrschaften, fürnemsten Stetten... Beschriben durch Sebastianum Münsterum... Basel, 1550; Ulrichs von Richental Chronik des Constanzer Concils 1414 bis 1418. Herausgegeben von M. R. Buck. Tübingen, 1882
 Cromer M. Polonia sive de situ, populis, moribus, magistratibus et republica regni Poloni libri duo. Cracoviae, 1901. (паўтоp выданьня 1578 г.)
 Der Weiss Kunig. Eine Erzählung von den Thaten Kaiser Maximilian der Ersten. Wien, 1775
 Historica Russiae monumenta ex antiquis exterarum gentium arcivis et bibliothecis deprompta ab A. I. Turgenevio. V. I. Petropoli, 1841 (Акты исторические, относящиеся к России, извлечённые из иностранных архивов и библиотек А. И. Тургеневым)
 Historiae Ruthenicae Scriptores exteri saeculi XVI. V. I—II. Berolini et Petropoli, 1841—42
 Kronika Jana z Czarnkowa (Joannis de Czarnkow. Chronicon Polonorum). Оprac. J. Szlachtowski. Monumenta Poloniae Historica Lwów, T. II. 1872
 Nordenskiöld, Adolf Erik Facsimile-Atlas to the Early History of Cartography with Reproductions of the Most Important Maps Printed in the XV and XVI Centuries. Stockholm, 1889. Замысловский Е. Е. Геpбеpштейн и его истоpико–геогpафические известия о России. СПб., 1884
 Il Mappamondo di Fra Mauro. A cura di Tullio Gasparini Leporace. Presentazione di Roberto Almagia. Venezia, 1956
 Ioannes Stobnicensis. Introductio in Ptolomei Cosmographiam. Cracoviae, 1512
 Ostrowski W. About the origin of the name «White Russia». London, 1975
 Peter Suchenwirt’s Werke aus dem vierzehnten Jahrhundert. Hrsg. von Alois Primisser. Wien, 1827
 Prisschuch Th. Des conzilis grundveste. Die historischen Volkslieder der Deutschen vom 13. bis 6. Jahrhundert. Bd. 1. Leipzig, 1865
 Prochaska A. Codex epistolaris Vitoldi. Cracoviae, 1882
 Rude & barbarous kingdom. Russia in the accounts of sixteenth-century English voyagers. Ed. by Lloyd E. Berry and Robert O. Crummey. Madison—London, 1968
 Sarmatiae Europeae descriptio. Ab Alexandro Guagnino Veronensi. Poloniae Historiae Corpus. Ex bibliotheca Ioan. Pistorii Nidani. Per Sebastiani Henric Petri. V. I. Basileae, 1588
 Scriptores Rerum Hungaricarum tempore ducum regumque stirpis Arpadianae gestarum. Vol. II. Budapest, 1938
 Starowolski Sz. Polska albo opisanie położenia królestwa Polskiego. Kraków, 1976
 Stryikowski M. Kronika Polska, Litewska, Żmódzka i wszystkiej Rusi. T. I-II. Warszawa, 1846
 Witkowska M. H. S. Vita sanctae Kyngae ducissae Cracoviensis. Roczniki Humanistyczne. T. X, z. 2. Lublin, 1961.
 Імя тваё «Белая Русь». Мн., 1991
 Опись архива Посольского приказа 1626 г. Ч. 1. М., 1977
 Порецкий Я. И. Соломон Рысинский * Solomo Pantherus Leucorussus. Мн., 1983
 ПСРЛ. Т. 2. СПб., 1843; Т. 25. М.—Л., 1949
 Рыбаков Б. А. Русские карты Московии XV — начала XVI в. М., 1974
 Савельева Е. А. Hовгоpод и Hовгоpодская земля в западноевропейской каpтогpафии XV—XVI вв.. Геогpафия России XV—XVIII вв. (по сведениям иностpанцев). Л., 1984
 Слово избpанное от святых писаний еже на латыню. Попов А. Н. Историко–литературный обзор дpевнеpусских полемических сочинений пpотив латинян. М., 1875

External links 
 Why is the Russia White?

Ruthenians in the Polish–Lithuanian Commonwealth
Historical regions in Belarus
Anti-Belarusian sentiment
Russian irredentism